Sport1 is a European sports channel which is currently available in Hungary, Czech Republic and Slovakia broadcasting in different languages. The channel is owned by AMC Networks International Central Europe. It currently holds the TV rights to broadcast National Football League games and Formula 1 races in the countries where the channel is available. Sport 1 a Sport 2 z 80% patří pod skupinu Nova Group

Romania 
In Romania, Sport1 was available from 2006 until 5 November 2014. The station held the rights for NFL, NHL, Ice Hockey World Championship and Heineken Cup, and in the first years for various football national championship, from Scotland, Hungary, France, Netherlands and others.

In 2012, Sport1 Romania shrank its broadcast space only between 10 P.M. and 7 A.M. except for some big events that start earlier, like the NFL playoffs or if the NFL or NHL games go for longer than 7 A.M., after the launch of children's channel Megamax on the same frequence.

From the NFL, Sport1 broadcast a late afternoon game and Monday Night Football, every week, half of the Thursday Night Football games, the opening game and all the Thanksgiving Day games. Starting with the 2013 season, sometimes an early afternoon game and/or Sunday Night Football were added to the schedule. The NFL Playoffs were shown with no exception, including the Pro Bowl and the Super Bowl.

Czech Republic and Slovakia 
In the Czech Republic and Slovakia it holds the exclusive rights for Formula One, KHL, the Champions Hockey League (including all games involving Czech and Slovak teams), and the National Football League.

External links 
 Sport1 Czech Republic
 Sport1 Slovakia
 Sport1 Hungary

AMC Networks International
Sports television networks
Television networks in Romania
Television channels and stations established in 2001
Sports television in Hungary
Sports television in Romania
Sports television in Slovakia